Rendsburg-Eckernförde is an electoral constituency (German: Wahlkreis) represented in the Bundestag. It elects one member via first-past-the-post voting. Under the current constituency numbering system, it is designated as constituency 4. It is located in north central Schleswig-Holstein, comprising almost the entirety of the Rendsburg-Eckernförde district.

Rendsburg-Eckernförde was created for the 1976 federal election. Since 2021, it has been represented by Sönke Rix of the Social Democratic Party (SPD).

Geography
Rendsburg-Eckernförde is located in north central Schleswig-Holstein. As of the 2021 federal election, it comprises the entirety of the Rendsburg-Eckernförde district with the exception of the municipalities of Altenholz and Kronshagen, which are part of the Kiel constituency.

History
Rendsburg-Eckernförde was created in 1976 and contained parts of the abolished constituencies of Schleswig – Eckernförde and Rendsburg – Neumünster. Until 2002, it was coterminous with the district of Rendsburg-Eckernförde; in 2002, the municipalities of Altenholz and Kronshagen were transferred to the Kiel constituency.

Members
The constituency was held by the Social Democratic Party (SPD) from its creation in 1976 until 1983, during which time it was represented by future Minister-President of Schleswig-Holstein Heide Simonis. It was won by the Christian Democratic Union (CDU) in 1983, and represented by former Minister-President of Schleswig-Holstein Gerhard Stoltenberg. In 1998, it was won by the SPD's Ulrike Mehl. The CDU's Otto Bernhardt won the constituency in 2005, and represented it for a single term before being succeeded by fellow CDU member Johann Wadephul in 2009. Sönke Rix was elected for the SPD in 2021.

Election results

2021 election

2017 election

2013 election

2009 election

2005 election

References

Federal electoral districts in Schleswig-Holstein
1976 establishments in West Germany
Constituencies established in 1976